Softball was contested by four teams at the 1994 Asian Games in Hiroshima, Japan from October 3 to October 7. The competition took place at the Shudo University.

China won the gold medal in a round robin competition.

Schedule

Medalists

Results
All times are Japan Standard Time (UTC+09:00)

Final standing

References
 New Straits Times, October 3–8, 1994
Results

External links
 Results

 
1994 Asian Games events
1994
Asian Games
1994 Asian Games